Norbert Nagy (born 23 December 1994 in Budapest) is a Hungarian racing driver currently competing in the European Touring Car Cup. He made his ETCC debut in 2013 and in 2016 finished 3rd in the Championship. Nagy has also raced in several WTCC events over the last few years.

Racing career
Nagy began his career in 2000 in karting. In 2010 he switched to the Hungarian Touring Car Championship, winning the F1.6 class that year. In 2011 Nagy raced in the Central European Zone Challenge, taking two race wins. Nagy switched to the SEAT León Supercopa Hungary in 2012, winning the championship in the end of the year. In 2013 switched to the European Touring Car Cup, racing in the championship for 2 years. In 2014 Nagy made his World Touring Car Championship debut with Campos Racing driving a SEAT León WTCC in the Belgian round of the championship.

Racing record

Complete European Touring Car Cup results
(key) (Races in bold indicate pole position) (Races in italics indicate fastest lap)

Complete World Touring Car Championship results
(key) (Races in bold indicate pole position – 1 point awarded just in first race; races in italics indicate fastest lap – 1 point awarded all races; * signifies that driver led race for at least one lap – 1 point given all races)

Complete World Touring Car Cup results
(key) (Races in bold indicate pole position) (Races in italics indicate fastest lap)

References

External links
 

1994 births
Living people
Hungarian racing drivers
European Touring Car Cup drivers
World Touring Car Championship drivers
Campos Racing drivers
24H Series drivers
Zengő Motorsport drivers